Technomyrmex gorgona is a species of ant in the genus Technomyrmex.

References

External links

Dolichoderinae
Insects described in 2008